Notagonum novaeguineae is a species of ground beetle in the subfamily Platyninae. It was described by Maindron in 1908.

References

Notagonum
Beetles described in 1908